Michel Pineda Ozaeta (born 9 June 1964) is a Spanish former professional footballer who played as a striker.

He amassed La Liga totals of 201 matches and 49 goals over six seasons, representing in the competition Espanyol (five years) and Racing de Santander.

Club career
The son of Spanish immigrants, Pineda was born in Gien, France, and played mainly in the country of his parents during his career, with spells in his nation of birth with AJ Auxerre and Sporting Toulon Var, appearing rarely in Ligue 1 with the former club over two seasons.

He returned to Spain in the 1984 off-season, signing for RCD Español and making his La Liga debut on 1 September against Atlético Madrid (0–0 home draw, 18 minutes played). In his third year he scored 13 league goals as the Catalans finished third – the league had a second stage, which caused all the teams to play 44 fixtures – netting a career-low with the club five in the 1988–89 campaign, which ended in relegation.

Pineda then returned to France, but moved back to the Iberian Peninsula in January 1993 with Racing de Santander, scoring seven goals in only ten matches as the Cantabrian side returned to the top flight. He added the game's only in the promotion/relegation play-off against Español, in Barcelona.

Pineda finished his career at the age of 32 after one season apiece with UE Lleida and Deportivo Alavés, both in Segunda División.

Honours

Club
Español
UEFA Cup runner-up: 1987–88

International
Spain
UEFA European Under-21 Championship: 1986

References

External links

1964 births
Living people
People from Gien
French people of Basque descent
French people of Spanish descent
Sportspeople from Loiret
Spanish footballers
French footballers
Footballers from Centre-Val de Loire
Association football forwards
Ligue 1 players
AJ Auxerre players
SC Toulon players
La Liga players
Segunda División players
RCD Espanyol footballers
Racing de Santander players
UE Lleida players
Deportivo Alavés players
Spain under-21 international footballers
Spain under-23 international footballers